Barletta Scalo is a railway station in the Italian town of Barletta, in the Province of Barletta-Andria-Trani, Apulia. The station lies on the Bari–Barletta railway. The train services are operated by Ferrotramviaria.

Train services
The station is served by the following service(s):

Bari Metropolitan services (FR2) Barletta - Andria - Bitonto - Aeroporto - Bari

See also
Railway stations in Italy
List of railway stations in Apulia
Rail transport in Italy
History of rail transport in Italy

References

Railway stations in Apulia
Railway station Scalo
Buildings and structures in the Province of Barletta-Andria-Trani
Railway stations opened in 1963